Krasny Meliorator is a rural locality (a khutor) and the administrative center of Baranovskoye Rural Settlement, Nikolayevsky District, Volgograd Oblast, Russia. The population was 1,169 as of 2010. There are 15 streets.

Geography 
Krasny Meliorator is located on Transvolga, on the east bank of the Volgograd Reservoir, 55 km east of Nikolayevsk (the district's administrative centre) by road. Oroshayemy is the nearest rural locality.

References 

Rural localities in Nikolayevsky District, Volgograd Oblast